Kong Que Ling is a China television series adapted from Gu Long's Qizhong Wuqi novel series. It was first broadcast on CCTV-1 on 2 January 2011.  It added a heavy dose of supernatural mysticism into the traditional wuxia story.

Cast
 Ashton Chen as Qiu Feng Wu (秋凤梧), Xiao Wu (小武)
 Minoca Mu as Liu Xing (刘星), Jin Xing (金星)
 Yu Bo as Qiu Tian Ming (秋天鸣)
 Wang Lu (王璐) as Gao Li (高立)
 Jin Chen (金晨) as Hou Jian (后简)
 Dee Wang (王梓诺) as Deng Yu Ru (邓玉如)
 Yu Shasha (于莎莎) as Shuang Shuang (双双)
 Wang Jian Fu (王建福) as Ma Feng (麻峰)

Synopsis

The Phoenix Manor (孔雀山庄) was famed in the pugilistic realms for its invincible weapon known as Kong Que Ling (Peacock's Feather).  Liu Xing's father Jin Kai Jia was the last known martial arts master to come up against it being used by Qiu Tian Ming, master of the Phoenix Manor.  When unleashed, the weapon killed many curious onlookers who had come to watch the rare occasion of the Kong Que Ling in action.  When the young Liu Xing arrived to seek her father at the duel site, she could not find her father amidst all the corpses.

About ten years later, in her search for her missing father, Liu Xing joined the mysterious and universally feared Green Dragon Society (青龙会) and rose high in its ranks.  The leaders of the Society were shown appearing as 2 Chinese dragons surrounded by thick metal chains in a cave.  They ordered Liu Xing to obtain the Kong Que Ling.

At the same time, the Society also ordered another of its assassin units led by Ximen Yu (西门玉) to disrupt the northern armed escort agencies from forming an alliance.  Deng Ding Hou (邓定侯), the head of one of the agencies, had initiated the proposal in response to the southern armed escort agencies falling to the Green Dragon Society.

Ximen Yu hatched a scheme to provoke enmity between Deng Ding Hou and the Phoenix Manor.  He ordered Ma Feng (麻峰), one of his subordinates, to pose as Qiu Tian Ming's son, Qiu Feng Wu, to woo Deng Ding Hou's daughter Deng Yu Ru (邓玉如).  The plan was to sneak Deng Yu Ru into the Phoenix Manor and murder her, making it look like Qiu Feng Wu had killed Deng Yu Ru after seducing her.

Liu Xing was unwittingly fooled into thinking Ma Feng was really Qiu Feng Wu.  After her spy who infiltrated the Manor informed her of the Phoenix Manor's tradition of the heir inheriting the Kong Que Ling upon getting married, she secretly murdered Deng Yu Ru and took her place, using a special skill to alter her appearance.

Meanwhile, the real Qiu Feng Wu had sneaked out of home to prove himself to his strict father.  Assuming the identity of Xiao Wu, a ne'er-do-well and gambler, he crossed paths with Liu Xing in both her identities as herself and as Deng Yu Ru, falling in love with the latter.  Infiltrating Ximen Qing's band of assassins, he foiled their plans to cut communication between the northern armed escort agencies.  He broke his cover to save a widely respected hero Bai Li Chang Qing (百里长青) who had been invited to spearhead the northern alliance. Fleeing from Ximen Qing, he was aided by another assassin Gao Li (高立),  who also respected Bai Li Chang Qing.

Liu Xing had also fallen in love with Xiao Wu, but was determined to accomplish her mission and continued to get close to Ma Feng.  When she finally realised Ma Feng was not the young scion of the Phoenix Manor, he had fallen for her hard.  Her sudden harsh rejection made him bitterly jealous of Xiao Wu.  His love turned into hatred as he had also betrayed the Society for her sake and hence had to be on the run forever.

Ma Feng soon found his past catching up with him as well when three mysterious people from his native land appeared in pursuit of his magical sword.  It was revealed that his home was located in the frozen far north, and his people were known as the Rain Tribe.  One of the pursuers was his childhood sweetheart, Hou Jian, who was being groomed to be the next Chief Shaman.  She needed the magical sword to complete the ritual to be the Chief Shaman.  Ten years before, he had apparently fled with the sword as he did not want Hou Jian to forget him – one of the results of the ritual completion was for the Chief Shaman to forget personal ties.

References

External links

Chinese wuxia television series
2011 Chinese television series debuts